Mariem Homrani (born 25 January 1991) is a Tunisian boxer. She competed in the women's lightweight event at the 2020 Summer Olympics.

References

External links
 

1991 births
Living people
Tunisian women boxers
Olympic boxers of Tunisia
Boxers at the 2020 Summer Olympics
African Games competitors for Tunisia
Competitors at the 2019 African Games
Sportspeople from Tunis
Competitors at the 2022 Mediterranean Games
20th-century Tunisian women
21st-century Tunisian women
Mediterranean Games competitors for Tunisia